The 2013 BRDC Formula 4 Championship was a multi-event motor racing championship for open wheel, formula racing cars held across England. The championship features a mix of professional motor racing teams and privately funded drivers competing in 2 litre Duratec single seat race cars that conform to the technical regulations for the championship. The 2013 season was the inaugural BRDC Formula 4 Championship organized by the British Racing Drivers' Club in the United Kingdom. The season began at Silverstone Circuit on 27 April and ended on 29 September at Donington Park. The series had eight triple header events all held in the United Kingdom.

Jake Hughes became the first drivers' champion after taking four race wins. He finished ahead of HHC Motorsport's driver Charlie Robertson, who won in Brands Hatch and Donington Park. Hillspeed's driver Seb Morris completed the top three in the drivers' standings.

Teams and drivers

Calendar and results
The Brands Hatch (18–19 May) and Snetterton (15–16 June) weekends were in support of the Deutsche Tourenwagen Masters and British GT respectively.

Standings

Drivers' championship

"Who zooms" award
This award was for the driver who made the most passes over the season.

References

External links
 

BRDC British Formula 3 Championship seasons
BRDC Formula 4
BRDC Formula 4